Trebsen is a town in the Leipzig district, in Saxony, Germany. It is situated on the river Mulde, 6 km northeast of Grimma, and 27 km east of Leipzig (centre).

Mayors 

In June 2015 Stefan Müller was elected the new mayor. Before S. Müller, Heidemarie Kolbe was 25 years in office.

References 

Leipzig (district)